PGE Skra Bełchatów 2009–2010 season is the 2009/2010 volleyball season for Polish professional volleyball club PGE Skra Bełchatów. The club won 6th title of Polish Champion, bronze medal of CEV Champions League and silver medal of FIVB Club World Championship.

The club competed in:
 Polish Championship
 Polish Cup
 CEV Champions League
 FIVB Club World Championship

Team roster

Squad changes for the 2010–2011 season
In:

Out:

References

External links
 PlusLiga 2009/10 profile

PGE Skra Bełchatów seasons